Philip Johnson (January 17, 1818 – January 29, 1867) was a Democratic member of the U.S. House of Representatives from Pennsylvania.

Biography
Philip Johnson was born in Polkville in Knowlton Township, New Jersey.  He moved to Upper Mount Bethel, Pennsylvania, in 1839.  He attended the common schools and Lafayette College in Easton, Pennsylvania, from 1842 to 1844.  He was a plantation tutor in Mississippi from 1844 to 1846.  He returned to Pennsylvania, studied law, and attended Union Law School in Easton.

He was admitted to the bar in 1848 and commenced practice in Easton.  He served as county court clerk from 1848 to 1853.  He was a member of the Pennsylvania House of Representatives in 1853 and 1854.  He served as revenue commissioner of the third judicial district in 1859 and 1860.  He was a delegate to the 1864 Democratic National Convention.

Johnson was elected as a Democrat to the Thirty-seventh, Thirty-eighth, and Thirty-ninth Congresses and until his death in Washington, D.C.  Interment in Easton Cemetery.

See also
List of United States Congress members who died in office (1790–1899)

Sources

Philip Johnson at The Political Graveyard

1818 births
1867 deaths
19th-century American lawyers
19th-century American politicians
Democratic Party members of the United States House of Representatives from Pennsylvania
Democratic Party members of the Pennsylvania House of Representatives
Pennsylvania lawyers
People from Knowlton Township, New Jersey
Politicians from Northampton County, Pennsylvania